Love is Not Enough is an EP by Spencer Albee. It was released on November 25, 2014.

Track listing
 "One 2 Three" – 4:32
 "I Don't Know" – 2:58
 "Love Is Not Enough" – 3:40
 "Get Out the State" – 2:50
 "So Long" – 2:30

References

2014 albums
Spencer Albee albums